The 2016–17 Mid-American Conference men's basketball season began with practices in October 2016, followed by the start of the 2016–17 NCAA Division I men's basketball season in November. Conference play began in January 2017 and concluded in March 2017. Akron won the regular season title with a conference record of 14–4 over a cluster of four teams tied at 11–7. Sixth-seeded Kent State upset Akron in the MAC tournament final and represented the MAC in the NCAA tournament where they lost to UCLA in the first round.

Preseason awards
The preseason poll and league awards were announced by the league office on October 28, 2016.

Preseason men's basketball poll
(First place votes in parenthesis)

East Division
 Akron 194 (15)
 Ohio 190 (16)
 Buffalo 144 (5)
 Kent State 116
 Bowling Green 63
 Miami 49

West Division
 Eastern Michigan 178 (16)
 Ball State 158 (12)
 Northern Illinois 148 (5)
 Toledo 100 (1)
 Western Michigan 95
 Central Michigan 77 (2)

Tournament champs
Akron (15), Ohio (11), Eastern Michigan (3), Buffalo (2), NIU (2), Central Michigan (1), Kent State (1), Miami (1).

Honors

Postseason

Mid–American tournament

NCAA tournament

Postseason awards

Coach of the Year: Keith Dambrot, Akron
Player of the Year: Isaiah Johnson, Akron
Freshman of the Year: Michael Weathers, Miami
Defensive Player of the Year: Dontay Caruthers, Buffalo
Sixth Man of the Year: Nick Perkins, Buffalo

Honors

See also
2016–17 Mid-American Conference women's basketball season

References